Salegentibacter salarius is a Gram-negative, rod-shaped and non-motile bacterium from the genus of Salegentibacter which has been isolated from a marine solar saltern from the Yellow Sea.

References

Flavobacteria
Bacteria described in 2007